HMS Nelson (pennant number: 28) was the name ship of her class of two battleships built for the Royal Navy in the 1920s. They were the first battleships built to meet the limitations of the Washington Naval Treaty of 1922. Entering service in 1927, the ship spent her peacetime career with the Atlantic and Home Fleets, usually as the fleet flagship. During the early stages of World War II, she searched for German commerce raiders, missed participating in the Norwegian Campaign after she was badly damaged by a mine in late 1939, and escorted convoys in the Atlantic Ocean.

In mid-1941 Nelson escorted several convoys to Malta before being torpedoed in September. After repairs she resumed doing so before supporting the British invasion of French Algeria during Operation Torch in late 1942. The ship covered the invasions of Sicily (Operation Husky) and Italy (Operation Avalanche) in mid-1943 while bombarding coastal defences during Operation Baytown. During the Normandy landings in June 1944, Nelson provided naval gunfire support before she struck a mine and spent the rest of the year under repair. The ship was transferred to the Eastern Fleet in mid-1945 and returned home a few months after the Japanese surrender in September to serve as the flagship of the Home Fleet. She became a training ship in early 1946 and was reduced to reserve in late 1947. Nelson was scrapped two years later after being used as a target for bomb tests.

Background and description

The Nelson-class battleship was essentially a smaller,  battleship version of the G3 battlecruiser which had been cancelled for exceeding the constraints of the 1922 Washington Naval Treaty.

Her crew numbered 1,361 officers and ratings when serving as a flagship and 1,314 as a private ship. The ship was powered by two sets of Brown-Curtis geared steam turbines, each driving one shaft, using steam from eight Admiralty 3-drum boilers.

Armament and fire control

The main battery of the Nelson-class ships consisted of nine breech-loading (BL) 16-inch guns in three turrets forward of the superstructure. Designated 'A', 'B' and 'C' from front to rear, 'B' turret superfired over the others. Their secondary armament consisted of a dozen BL  Mk XXII guns in twin-gun turrets aft of the superstructure, three turrets on each broadside. Their anti-aircraft (AA) armament consisted of six quick-firing (QF)  Mk VIII guns in unshielded single mounts and eight QF 2-pounder guns in single mounts. The ships were fitted with two submerged 24.5-inch (622 mm) torpedo tubes, one on each broadside, angled 10° off the centreline.

The Nelsons were built with two director-control towers fitted with  rangefinders to control the main guns. One was mounted above the bridge and the other was at the aft end of the superstructure. Each turret was also fitted with a  rangefinder. A back-up director for the main armament was positioned on the roof of the conning tower in an armoured hood. The secondary armament was controlled by four directors equipped with  rangefinders. One pair were mounted on each side of the main director on the bridge roof and the others were abreast the aft main director. The anti-aircraft directors were situated on a tower abaft the main-armament director with a 12-foot high-angle rangefinder in the middle of the tower. A pair of torpedo-control directors with 15-foot rangefinders were positioned abreast the funnel.

Protection
To improve its ability to deflect plunging fire, its upper edge was inclined 18° outward.

The top of the armoured citadel of the Nelson-class ships was protected by an armoured deck that rested on the top of the belt armour.

It consisted of an empty outer watertight compartment and an inner water-filled compartment.

Modifications
The high-angle directors and rangefinder and their platform were replaced by a new circular platform for the High Angle Control System (HACS) Mk I director in May–June 1930. By March 1934, the single two-pounder guns and the starboard torpedo director were removed and replaced by a single octuple two-pounder "pom-pom" mount on the starboard side of the funnel. It was provided with a Mk I director mounted on the bridge roof. In 1934–1935, Nelson was fitted with a pair of quadruple mounts for Vickers  anti-aircraft machine guns that were positioned on the forward superstructure. The ship was also fitted with a crane to handle a Supermarine Seagull biplane flying boat carried for test purposes; the crane was retained after the end of the trials. Sometime in 1936–1937, she received her portside "pom-pom" and its director. In addition gun shields were fitted to the 4.7-inch guns although they were removed by March 1938. During her refit from June 1937 to January 1938, Nelson had her high-angle director tower reinforced and enlarged to accommodate a pair of HACS Mk III directors and new non-cemented deck armour was installed. Like the aft deck armour, it was at the level of the bottom of the armour belt, and extended forward from the front of the citadel  almost to the bow; ranging in thickness from  close to the citadel to  near the bow.

While under repair from January–August 1940 after being mined in December 1939, Nelson had her aft 6-inch directors replaced by a pair of octuple 2-pounder "pom-pom" mounts and another was added on the quarterdeck. She was also fitted with a Type 279 early-warning radar. Gun shields were reinstalled on the 4.7-inch guns and a pair of four 20-tube  UP rocket launchers were mounted on the roofs of 'B' and 'C' turrets. These changes increased the size of her crew to 1,452.

During her repairs after being torpedoed in October 1941, Nelson had her torpedo tubes and UP rocket launchers removed and an octuple 2-pounder "pom-pom" mount was installed on the roof of 'B' turret. A pair of  Oerlikon AA guns were installed on the roof of 'C' turret and eleven more were mounted in various places on the superstructure; all of which were in single mounts. The existing "pom-pom" directors were replaced by Mk III models and three additional directors were fitted. Each of these directors was equipped with a Type 282 gunnery radar. The HACS directors received Type 285 gunnery radars while the forward main-armament director was fitted with a Type 284 gunnery radar. The ship was also equipped with a Type 273 surface-search radar and four Type 283 radars for using the 16- and 6-inch guns in barrage (anti-aircraft) fire. Another Oerlikon gun was added to the roof of 'C' turret during a refit in September–October 1942. The 0.5-inch Vickers machine guns were removed and 26 single Oerlikon guns were added in May–June 1943; five of which were on the roof of 'C' turret and the other were mounted on the deck and the superstructure.

While refitting in the United States in late 1944 to prepare her for operations in the Pacific Ocean, her anti-aircraft armament was augmented with 21 more Oerlikon guns for a total of 61 weapons. The back-up director and its armoured hood were replaced by a new platform for a pair of quadruple mounts for 40 mm Bofors AA guns; another pair of quadruple mounts were added abaft the funnel. Most of the "pom-pom" directors were replaced by four Mk 51 directors for the Bofors guns.

Construction and career 
Nelson, named after Vice-Admiral Horatio Nelson, was the third ship of her name to serve in the Royal Navy. She was laid down on 28 December 1922 as part of the 1922 Naval Programme at Armstrong Whitworth's Low Walker shipyard in North Tyneside, Newcastle upon Tyne and was launched on 3 September 1925. After completing her preliminary sea trials, she was commissioned on 15 August 1927 at a cost of £7,504,055. The Nelson-class ships received several nicknames: Nelsol and Rodnol after the Royal Fleet Auxiliary oil tankers with a prominent amidships superstructure and names ending in "ol", The Queen's Mansions after a resemblance between her superstructure and the Queen Anne's Mansions block of flats, the pair of boots, the ugly sisters and the Cherry Tree class as they were cut down by the Washington Naval Treaty. Nelsons trials resumed after she was formally commissioned and continued in October; the ship entered service on 21 October as the flagship of the Atlantic Fleet (renamed as Home Fleet in March 1932) and remained so, aside from refits or repairs, until 1 April 1941. Prince George, Duke of Kent, the fourth son of King George V and Queen Mary, served aboard her as a lieutenant on the Admiral's staff until his transfer to the light cruiser  in 1928. In April 1928, the ship hosted King Amanullah of Afghanistan during exercises off Portland.

On 29 March 1931, she collided with the steamship , of Cardiff, Wales, in foggy conditions off Cape Gilano, Spain, although neither vessel was badly damaged. Nelsons damage was repaired in July. In mid-September, the crew of Nelson took part in the Invergordon Mutiny when they refused orders to go to sea for an exercise, although they relented after several days when the Admiralty reduced the severity of the pay cuts that prompted the mutiny. On 12 January 1934, she ran aground on Hamilton's Shoal, just off Southsea, as she was about to depart with the Home Fleet for the spring cruise in the West Indies. After removing some supplies and equipment, the ship floated off during the next high tide, undamaged. The subsequent investigation did not find any of the ship's officers at fault, attributing the incident to her poor handling at low speed. Nelson participated in King George V's Silver Jubilee Fleet Review in Spithead on 16 July 1935 and then King George VI's Coronation Fleet Review on 20 May 1937. After a lengthy refit later that year, the ship visited Lisbon, Portugal, together with her sister  in February 1938.

Second World War
When Great Britain declared war on Germany, on 3 September 1939, Nelson and the bulk of the Home Fleet were unsuccessfully patrolling the waters between Iceland, Norway and Scotland for German blockade runners and then did much the same off the Norwegian coast from 6–10 September. On 25–26 September, she helped to cover the salvage and rescue operations of the damaged submarine . A month later, the ship covered an iron ore convoy from Narvik, Norway. On 4 December 1939, she detonated a magnetic mine (laid by ) at the entrance to Loch Ewe on the Scottish coast and was under repair in HM Dockyard, Portsmouth, until August 1940. The mine blew a  hole in the hull forward of 'A' turret which flooded the torpedo compartment and some adjacent compartments. The flooding caused a small list and caused the ship to trim down by the bow. No one was killed, but 74 sailors were wounded.

After returning to service in August, Nelson, Rodney and the battlecruiser  were transferred from Scapa Flow to Rosyth, Scotland, in case of invasion. When the signal from the armed merchant cruiser  that she was being attacked by the German heavy cruiser  on 5 November was received by the Admiralty, Nelson and Rodney were deployed to block the gap between Iceland and the Faroe Islands, although Admiral Scheer headed for the South Atlantic afterwards. When the Admiralty learned that Gneisenau and Scharnhorst were attempting to breakout into the North Atlantic to resume commerce raiding operations, Nelson, Rodney and the battlecruiser  were ordered on 25 January 1941 to assume a position south of Iceland where they could intercept them. After spotting a pair of British cruisers on 28 January, the German ships turned away and were not pursued.

Nelson became a private ship on 1 April and she was detached to escort Convoy WS.7 from the UK to South Africa, visiting Freetown, Sierra Leone, on the 4th. Bismarck was sunk the following day well before Nelson and her consort could reach her. On 1 June, the battleship was assigned to escort Convoy SL.75 to the UK. After the German supply ship Gonzenheim was able to evade the armed merchant cruiser  on 4 June, Nelson was detached to intercept the German ship, which was scuttled by her crew when they spotted Nelson approaching later that day. After arriving in the UK, the ship rejoined the Home Fleet.

Mediterranean service

On 11 July, the ship was assigned to escort Convoy WS.9C that consisted of merchantmen that were to pass into the Mediterranean to deliver troops and supplies to Malta. Once they passed Gibraltar, the escorts were designated as Force X and they were to be reinforced by Force H while in the Western Mediterranean. The ships entered the Mediterranean on the night of 20/21 July and they were attacked by Italian aircraft beginning on the morning of the 23rd. Nelson was not engaged and joined Force H later that day as the merchantmen and their escort continued onwards to Malta. The cruisers from Force X rejoined them two days later and the combined force arrived back in Gibraltar on 27 July. On 31 July–4 August, Force H provided distant cover to another convoy to Malta (Operation Style). Vice-Admiral James Somerville, commander of Force H, transferred his flag to Nelson on 8 August. Several weeks later, the ship participated in Operation Mincemeat, during which Force H escorted a minelayer to Livorno to lay its mines while s aircraft attacked Northern Sardinia as a diversion. On 13 September, Force H escorted Ark Royal and the aircraft carrier  into the Western Mediterranean as they flew off 45 Hawker Hurricane fighters to Malta.

As part of a deception operation when Operation Halberd, another mission to convey troops and supplies to Malta, began on 24 September, Somerville's flag was transferred to Rodney while Nelson and some escorting destroyers departed Gibraltar heading westwards as if the former ship had relieved the latter. Rodney and the rest of Force H headed eastwards with Nelson and her escorts joining the main body during the night. It blew a  hole in the bow, wrecked the torpedo compartment and caused extensive flooding; there were no casualties amongst the crew. After emergency repairs were made in Gibraltar, the ship proceeded to Rosyth where she was under repair until May 1942.

Nelson was assigned to the Eastern Fleet after she finished working up and departed 31 May, escorting Convoy WS.19P from the Clyde to Freetown and its continuation WS.19PF to Durban, South Africa, en route. She was recalled on 26 June to participate in Operation Pedestal, a major effort to resupply Malta. Reaching Scapa Flow exactly a month later, she became the flagship of Vice-Admiral Edward Syfret, commander of the operation, the following day. The convoy departed the Clyde on 3 August and conducted training before passing through the Strait of Gibraltar on the night of 9/10 August. The convoy was spotted later that morning and the Axis attacks began the following day with the sinking of Eagle by a German submarine. Despite repeated attacks by Axis aircraft and submarines, Nelson was not damaged and made no claims to have shot down any aircraft before the convoy's capital ships turned back before reaching the Skerki Banks between Sicily and Tunisia late in the day on the 12th. The ship returned to Scapa Flow afterwards.

She was transferred to Force H in October to support Operation Torch, departing on the 30th and she arrived in Gibraltar on 6 November. Syfret, now commander of Force H, hoisted his flag aboard Nelson on 15 November. Force H covered a troop convoy from Gibraltar to Algiers, French Algeria, in January 1943. Syfret temporarily transferred his flag to the battleship  in May as Nelson returned to Scapa Flow to train for Operation Husky, the invasion of Sicily. The ship departed Scapa on 17 June and arrived at Gibraltar on the 23rd.

1943–1949
On 9 July, Force H, with Nelson, Rodney and the carrier , rendezvoused in the Gulf of Sirte with the battleships ,  and the carrier  coming from Alexandria, Egypt to form the covering force for the invasion. On 31 August, Nelson and Rodney bombarded coastal artillery positions between Reggio Calabria and Pessaro in preparation for Operation Baytown, the amphibious invasion of Calabria, Italy. The sisters covered the amphibious landings at Salerno (Operation Avalanche) on 9 September with Nelson using her main guns in "barrage" mode to deter attacking German torpedo bombers. The Italian armistice was signed between General Dwight Eisenhower and Marshal Pietro Badoglio aboard the ship on 29 September.

Nelson departed Gibraltar on 31 October for England to rejoin the Home Fleet. She provided naval gunfire support during the Normandy landings in June 1944, but was badly damaged after hitting two mines on the 18th. Temporarily repaired in Portsmouth, the ship was sent to the Philadelphia Naval Shipyard in the United States on 22 June for repairs. She returned to Britain in January 1945 and was then assigned to the Eastern Fleet, arriving in Colombo, Ceylon, on 9 July. The ship became the fleet flagship three days later. Nelson was used on the western coast of the Malayan Peninsula for three months, taking part in Operation Livery. The Japanese forces there formally surrendered aboard her at George Town, Penang, on 2 September 1945. Ten days later, the ship was present when the Japanese forces in all of South-east Asia surrendered in Singapore.

Nelson was relieved as flagship on 20 September and departed for home on 13 October. She arrived at Portsmouth on 17 November and became the flagship of the Home Fleet a week later. King George V replaced her as flagship on 9 April 1946 and Nelson became a training ship in July. When the Training Squadron was formed on 14 August, the ship became flagship of the Rear-Admiral that commanded the training battleships. She was relieved as flagship by the battleship  in October and became a private ship. Nelson was slightly damaged by a collision with the submarine  in Portland on 15 April 1947. The ship was placed in reserve on 20 October 1947 at Rosyth and was listed for disposal on 19 May 1948. From 4 June to 23 September, she was used as a target ship for  armour-piercing aerial bombs to evaluate their ability to penetrate the ship's armoured deck. Nelson was turned over to the British Iron & Steel Corporation on 5 January 1949 and was allocated to Thos. W. Ward for scrapping. The ship arrived at Inverkeithing on 15 March to begin demolition.

Notes

References

External links

 Maritimequest HMS Nelson Photo Gallery
 Nelson on Battleships-Cruisers.co.uk

 

Nelson-class battleships
Ships built by Armstrong Whitworth
Ships built on the River Tyne
1925 ships
World War II battleships of the United Kingdom
Maritime incidents in 1934